Justdial is an Indian internet technology company that provides local search for different services in India over the phone, website and mobile apps. Founded in 1996 by V. S. S. Mani, the company is headquartered in Mumbai, India. In addition to its headquarters, Justdial has offices in Ahmedabad, Bangalore, Chandigarh, Chennai, Coimbatore, New Delhi, Hyderabad, Jaipur, Kolkata, and Pune. In 2020, Justdial had 10,984 employees and a database of approximately 29.4 million listings and 536,236 active paid campaigns. On 16 July 2021, Reliance Retail acquired a 66.95% stake in Justdial for  crores.

History
In 1987, while working for a yellow pages company, V. S. S. Mani thought of replacing yellow pages with a database of information that users could call to receive current information about local business listings. To launch his venture, Mani acquired the Mumbai landline phone number 2888-8888.

In 2007, an Internet and mobile app version of the database called Justdial.com was launched.

To encourage retail investment, Justdial had promised that they would buy back shares from retail investors at the IPO price if Justdial's share price fell sharply within the first six months. By the close of the market on the day of the IPO, the majority of new investments had come from foreign institutional investors. On 16 July 2021, Reliance Retail acquired a 66.95% stake in JustDial for  crores. As per the deal, Reliance Retail will hold 40.95 per cent, and will make an open offer to acquire up to 26 per cent in accordance with takeover regulations. The deal also mentioned that Justdial will allow Reliance access to the 25-year-old listings company’s merchant database and Mani will continue to lead Justdial as managing director and chief executive officer.

Products and services
Justdial's service is a database of business listings that users can either access by phone or online. The company also operates "Justdial Social", a service that aggregates content from social media websites, TV broadcast, news, and other sources; and "Search Plus Service", a service that manages online transactions via the web and mobile apps.

Security Flaws 
On 10 October 2019, Indian-based independent security researcher Ehraz Ahmed detected a major security flaw in eleadmarket’s Register API. The flaw allowed competent hackers to log into any eleadmarket account by simply placing the phone number in the username parameter. By doing so, this granted the hacker access to any person’s Justdial account. This vulnerability puts the user’s personal data at risk, but also compromises the user’s social profile since the hacker could use the system ID generated by exploiting the flaw to access the JustDial Pay account, and post on the user’s social profile.

eleadmarket acknowledged that there was a bug in one of its API. There was no loss of any data or financial loss reported.

See also
 Local search (Internet)
 Local advertising
 Online advertising

References

Online companies of India
Companies listed on the National Stock Exchange of India
Companies listed on the Bombay Stock Exchange